Laima Balaišytė (married name Laima Amelin; born 3 January 1948) is a former international table tennis player from Lithuania.

Table tennis career
She won a silver medal at the 1967 World Table Tennis Championships in the Corbillon Cup (women's team event) with Svetlana Grinberg, Signe Paisjärv and Zoja Rudnova for the Soviet Union.

Two years later she won the gold medal at the 1969 World Table Tennis Championships in the Corbillon Cup (women's team event) with Grinberg, Rudnova and Rita Pogosova for the Soviet Union.

She was the Soviet Union National Champion in 1962 and 1964.

Personal life
She married fellow table tennis international Anatoly Amelin.

See also
 List of World Table Tennis Championships medalists

References

Lithuanian female table tennis players
Soviet table tennis players
1948 births
Living people
Sportspeople from Vilnius
World Table Tennis Championships medalists